Koskol, is a village in the Ulytau District, Karaganda Region, Kazakhstan. It is the head of the Koskol Rural District (КАТО code — 356055100). Population:

Geography
A road skirting the northern end of the lake links Koskol with Karsakpay to the east.

See also
Turan Depression

References

Populated places in Karaganda Region